Obrima is a genus of moths in the family Erebidae. The genus was erected by Francis Walker in 1856.

Species
 Obrima pyraloides Walker, 1856
 Obrima rinconada Schaus, 1894

References

Eulepidotinae
Moth genera